Ultonia may refer to:

Ulster (latinized as Ultonia), a province in Ireland
SS Ultonia, a passenger steamship
Ultonia Regiment of the Spanish army